Dioscorea aguilarii is a herbaceous vine in the genus Dioscorea which is indigenous to El Salvador. The type specimen was collected in 1994 from an oak forest between Pena del Cuervo and Cerro El Yupe.

References 

aguilarii